Jane Scovell (born in Brockton, Massachusetts) is an American author, journalist and playwright.

She is the author of collaborative autobiographies with Marilyn Horne, Elizabeth Taylor, Kitty Dukakis, Ginger Rogers, Cheryl Landon Wilson (Michael Landon), Maureen Stapleton, Kathy Levine, Petra Nemcova and Tim Conway. She has also written biographies of Oona O’Neill Chaplin and Samuel Ramey.

References

External links 
 Official website

Living people
American biographers
American dramatists and playwrights
American women journalists
Writers from Brockton, Massachusetts
Year of birth missing (living people)
American women biographers
Writers from Manhattan
21st-century American women